Gnathopyllum is a genus of shrimp, containing the following species:

Gnathophyllum americanum Guérin-Méneville, 1856
Gnathophyllum ascensione Manning, & Chace, 1990
Gnathophyllum circellum Manning, 1963
Gnathophyllum elegans (Risso, 1816)
Gnathophyllum modestum Hay, 1917
Gnathophyllum oceanicum Ahyong, 2015
Gnathophyllum panamense Faxon, 1893
Gnathophyllum precipuum Titgen, 1989
Gnathophyllum splendens Chace & Fuller, 1971
Gnathophyllum taylori Ahyong, 2003

References

Palaemonoidea
Decapod genera